Holger Rune was the defending champion but chose not to defend his title.

Otto Virtanen won the title after defeating Jan-Lennard Struff 6–2, 7–5 in the final.

Seeds

Draw

Finals

Top half

Bottom half

References

External links
Main draw
Qualifying draw

Trofeo Faip–Perrel - 1
2022 Singles